Pterolophia lateralis is a species of beetle in the family Cerambycidae. It was described by Charles Joseph Gahan in 1895. It has a wide distribution in Asia.

Subspecies
 Pterolophia lateralis lateralis Gahan, 1895
 Pterolophia lateralis formosana Schwarzer, 1925

References

lateralis
Beetles described in 1895